Girl Play is an independent film produced in 2004 by Gina G. Goff and Laura A. Kellam of Goff-Kellam Productions.  The feature film was directed by Lee Friedlander.  The film premiered at Outfest in 2004, and had a limited theatrical release in 2005.

Plot
Robin, who has been married to her wife for six years, and Lacie, who has never had a lasting relationship, are both cast to play lesbian lovers in a Los Angeles stage play. Innocently, the stage director, Gabriel runs the actresses through a series of rehearsals designed to "bring out the intimacy" in each performer. Soon the two women find themselves increasingly and undeniably attracted to each other and overcome with desire. They must ask themselves whether this relationship is manufactured, created for the sake of the "girl play," or is true love.

Cast
 Robin Greenspan as Robin
 Lacie Harmon as Lacie
 Mink Stole as Robin's Mother
 Dom DeLuise as Gabriel
 Katherine Randolph as Audrey
 Lauren Maher as Cass
 Gina DeVivo as Robin at Age 14
 Shannon Perez as Young Robin at Age 6
 Dominic Ottersbach as Gabriel's Assistant
 Julie Briggs as Dr. Katherine
 Peter Ente as Robin's Father
 Graham T. McClusky as Parents Friend
 Skye Emerson as Bartender
 Jessica Golden as Laura, Drunk girl in bar
 Lynn A. Henderson as Attractive Girl in Bar
 Sara Bareilles as Singer in bar

Awards
 L.A. Outfest "Outstanding Lesbian Feature Film"
 L.A. Outfest "Outstanding Actress In A Film" – Shared by Lead Actresses Robin Greenspan & Lacie Harmon
 Tampa International Gay and Lesbian Film Festival "Jury Award for Best Women’s Feature Film"
 Tampa International Gay and Lesbian Film Festival "Audience Award for Best Women’s Feature Film"
 Tampa International Gay and Lesbian Film Festival "Best Actress – Lacie Harmon"
 Tampa International Gay and Lesbian Film Festival "Best Director – Lee Friedlander"
 NewFest "Audience Award for Best Feature Film"
 Fort Worth Gay & Lesbian Film Festival "Best Lesbian Film"
 Philadelphia International Gay & Lesbian Film Festival "Audience Award for Best Lesbian Feature Film"
 Immagineria International Lesbian Film Festival "Audience Award for Best Feature Film"

References

External links 
 
 
 Girl Play at Goff Productions Website

2004 films
2004 romantic drama films
2004 LGBT-related films
American romantic drama films
American LGBT-related films
Lesbian-related films
LGBT-related romantic drama films
Films about actors
Films set in Los Angeles
2000s English-language films
2000s American films